Face the Day is the sixth album by 24-7 Spyz. It is the first Spyz album in more than a decade, recorded two years after their reformation in 2003. Guitarist and vocalist Jimi Hazel and bassist Rick Skatore return with a new drummer, Tobias Ralph (formerly of Bruce Hornsby and the Range).

Surprisingly, bassist Rick Skatore does not contribute any songwriting to the album, which contains songs written by Jimi Hazel, some of which appeared on his 2002 solo album 21stCenturySouthBronxRockStar. The album contains the usual amalgam of genres, from heavy metal and hard rock to jazz and R&B. However, reggae and ska make up a larger amount of the music on the album compared to previous Spyz releases.

The album also features cover versions of Thin Lizzy's "Bad Reputation" from their 1977 album of the same name, and Sly and the Family Stone's "Stand!" also the title track of its respective album.

Track listing
 "Unknown Wellknown"
 "Face the Day"
 "Waiting for the Sun"
 "Soul Sucker"
 "Ride to Nowhere"
 "Faithless"
 "The Saturday Song"
 "Angel"
 "Blues for Dimebag"
 "Running"
 "Anything for You"
 "Plastique"
 "Bad Reputation"
 "Stand!"

Remaster track listing
 "Face the Day"
 "Waiting for the Sun"
 "Soul Sucker"
 "Ride to Nowhere"
 "Faithless"
 "The Saturday Song"
 "Angel"
 "Blues for Dimebag"
 "Running"
 "Anything for You"
 "Plastique"
 "Bad Reputation"
 "Stand!"
 "HMS4L!" (instrumental version of Unknown Wellknown)

All songs are witten by Jimi Hazel, except "Plastique" (Iwan van Amersfoort, Zwazi, Jimi Hazel), "Bad Reputation" (Lynott, Gorham, Downey) and "Stand!" (Sylvester Stewart)

Personnel

24-7 Spyz:
 Jimi Hazel: guitars, vocals
 Rick Skatore: bass
 Tobias Ralph: drums

Guests:
 Ron "Bumblefoot" Thal: mixing, production, guitars and backing vocals on some tracks
 Doug Pinnick: vocals on 'Stand!'
 Iwan van Amersfoort and Zwazi: vocals on 'Plastique'
 Klaas 'Supa' de Beer: Dutch Grunts & 'Good vibes'

References

External links

2006 albums
24-7 Spyz albums